
Ah Yeah may refer to:

Music

Albums
 Ah Yeah (EP), a 2015 EP by South Korean girl group EXID

Songs
 "Ah Yeah", song by K-pop girl group EXID from their extended play of the same title
 "Ah Yeah!", song by Australian producer and DJ Will Sparks
 "Ah Yeah!!", song by Japanese jazz fusion duo Sukima Switch
 "Ah-Yeah", song by American rapper KRS-One from his eponymous studio album

See also
Oh Yeah (disambiguation)